This is a list of diplomatic missions in Indonesia. At present, the capital city of Jakarta hosts 106 embassies. As Jakarta hosts the headquarters of the Association of Southeast Asian Nations (ASEAN), a number of countries, both members and observers, have missions to it, which are separate from their respective embassies to Indonesia. 

This listing excludes honorary consulates.

Diplomatic missions in Jakarta 
See also : List of diplomatic missions in Jakarta

Embassies

Missions to the Association of Southeast Asian Nations (ASEAN)

 (Delegation)

Other missions/delegations 
 (Delegation)
 (Economic & Trade Office)
 (Economic & Trade Office)

Consular missions

Atambua
 (Consulate-General)

Batam
 (Consulate-General)

Denpasar

 (Consulate-General)
 (Consulate-General)
 (Consulate-General)
 (Consulate-General)
 (Consulate-General)
 (Consulate)
 (Consulate)
 (Consular Agency)

Jayapura
 (Consulate-General)

Kupang
 (Consulate-General)

Makassar
 (Consulate-General)
 (Consular Office)

Manado
 (Consulate-General)

Medan

  (Consulate-General)
  (Consulate-General)
  (Consulate-General)
  (Consulate-General)
  (Consulate-General)
  (Consulate)

Pekanbaru
 (Consulate)

Pontianak
 (Consulate)

Surabaya

 (Consulate-General)
 (Consulate-General)
 (Consulate-General)
 (Economic & Trade Office)
 (Consulate-General)

Non Resident Embassies

Resident in Beijing, China

Resident in Canberra, Australia

Resident in Kuala Lumpur, Malaysia

Resident in New Delhi, India

Resident in Singapore

Resident in Tokyo, Japan

Resident in Washington, D.C., United States of America

Resident in New York City, United States of America

Other Resident Locations 

 (Hanoi)
 (Bangkok)
 (Valletta)
 (Manila)
 (Seoul)

Closed missions

See also 
 List of diplomatic missions of Indonesia
 Foreign relations of Indonesia
 List of diplomatic missions in Jakarta

References

External links 
 Ministry of Foreign Affairs of the Republic of Indonesia
 Missions of the Republic of Indonesia

Diplomatic missions
Indonesia